Hyatt E. Covey (September 1, 1875 – August 3, 1968) was 15th Lieutenant Governor of South Dakota from 1927 to 1929. He was a member of the Republican Party and served with a Democratic Party governor, William J. Bulow. He was from Hamill, South Dakota.

Biography
He was born at LeRoy, Illinois, and attended normal school at Normal, Illinois. He graduated from the University of Chicago, with an A. B. degree in 1901, and became principal of the Montevideo, Minnesota, high school before homesteading in Tripp County, South Dakota in 1912. He commenced farming and stock raising and served in the state senate of the South Dakota Legislature, being elected in 1918, 1920, 1922, and 1924. He was elected lieutenant governor in 1926. He died in Tripp County.

Notes 

Lieutenant Governors of South Dakota
People from McLean County, Illinois
South Dakota state senators
University of Chicago alumni
1968 deaths
1875 births
People from Tripp County, South Dakota